Francisco de Avila (1573–1647) was a South American priest and early student of native customs.

Avila was born in Cuzco.  He was curate or vicar in the province of Huarochiri of Peru, later curate at Huánuco, and finally Canon of the Church of La Plata (now Sucre), in Bolivia. He was one of the most active investigators of Indian rites and customs of his time.  He died in Lima.

Works
In 1608 he wrote a treatise of the "Errors, False Gods, and Other Superstitions of the Indians of the Provinces of Huarochiri, Mama, and Chaclla", of which only the first six chapters are known to exist and have been translated into English. It is a contribution to the knowledge of the Peruvian Indians and their lore.

In 1611 Avila wrote a report on the Indians of Huánuco in eastern Peru, of which the unpublished manuscript is extant. These works contain apologetics on the destruction of fetishes and other objects of worship, for example by Pablo José Arriaga.

References

External links
 AVILA, Francisco de, DIOSES Y HOMBRES DE HUAROCHIRÍ (fragmentos)

1573 births
1647 deaths
17th-century Peruvian Roman Catholic priests
Bolivian Roman Catholic priests